Harry Connick Jr. is an eponymous instrumental album released in 1987. It is Harry Connick Jr.'s first album from Columbia Records. Like most of his other albums, it is dedicated to Harry's mother, Anita Connick, who died of ovarian cancer when he was 13. "Sunny Side Of The Street" is dedicated to James Booker, a singer and pianist who tutored Connick.

Track listing
"Love Is Here to Stay" (George Gershwin, Ira Gershwin) 4:10
"Little Clown" (H. Connick Jr.) 5:50
"Zealousy" (H. Connick Jr.) 1:34
"Sunny Side Of The Street" (Dorothy Fields, Jimmy McHugh) 3:23
"I Mean You" (Thelonious Monk) 5:23
"Vocation" (H. Connick Jr.) 5:04
"On Green Dolphin Street" (Ned Washington, Bronisław Kaper) 5:00
"Little Waltz" (Ron Carter) 4:14
"E" (H. Connick Jr.) 4:05

Musicians
Harry Connick Jr. – Piano
Ron Carter – Bass
Reginald Veal – Bass on "E"
Herlin Riley – Drums on "E"

Certifications

External links
 Harry Connick Jr. on Connick's official site

Harry Connick Jr. albums
Instrumental albums
1987 albums
Columbia Records albums